Joseph F. "Jody" Steverson (born August 21, 1968) is a Republican member of the Mississippi House of Representatives, representing the 4th district. Steverson is the Director of Voice and Data for Ripley Video Cable Company. On November 5, 2015, Steverson switched his party affiliation to Republican Party, two days after being reelected unopposed as a Democrat.

References

External links
 Jody Steverson at Vote Smart
 Jody Steverson at Ballotpedia
 Jody Steverson at Mississippi House of Representatives
 

1968 births
Living people
Members of the Mississippi House of Representatives
Mississippi Democrats
Mississippi Republicans
Politicians from Tupelo, Mississippi
Mississippi State University alumni
21st-century American politicians
People from Ripley, Mississippi